St Mary's Church is a Roman Catholic parish church in Stirling, Scotland. It was built from 1904 to 1905 and designed by Peter Paul Pugin in the Gothic Revival style. It is located between Upper Bridge Street and Crofthead Road to the north of the city centre. It is a category B listed building.

History

Foundation
In 1835, a plot of land on Irving Place was bought for the construction of a Catholic church. In 1836, construction work began. In 1838, the first Catholic church in Stirling since the Reformation was opened. It was the Church of the Most Holy Trinity.

Construction
Towards the end of the 1800s, the church was becoming too small to accommodate the increasing Catholic population in Stirling. On 4 May 1904, the foundation stone of the current church, St Mary's Church, was laid by the Archbishop of St Andrews and Edinburgh, James Smith. Construction of the church was partially paid for by Lady Agnes Murray of Polmaise Castle. The church was designed by Peter Paul Pugin in the Gothic Revival style. In 1905, the church was opened.

Parish
St Mary's Church is in the same parish as Holy Spirit Church and St Margaret Mary Church in Stirling. St Mary's Church has two Sunday Masses at 6:00pm on Saturday and 11:00am on Sunday.

See also
 Archdiocese of St Andrews and Edinburgh

References

External links
 

Category B listed buildings in Stirling (council area)
Churches in Stirling (council area)
Roman Catholic churches in Scotland
Buildings and structures in Stirling (city)
Listed Roman Catholic churches in Scotland
Gothic Revival church buildings in Scotland
1838 establishments in Scotland
Roman Catholic churches completed in 1905
Religious organizations established in 1838
20th-century Roman Catholic church buildings in the United Kingdom